Craig Kelly (born 16 June 1966) is a former Australian rules football player with Collingwood Football Club and served as a successful player manager.  He is the grandson of famous free marketeer and former Government Minister, C.R. "Bert" Kelly.

Pre VFL/AFL
Kelly began playing top-level football with the Norwood Football Club in the SANFL. He was drafted to Collingwood in the 1986 National draft, as pick no. 34

Collingwood
Kelly made his debut in 1989 and became a tough defender. He played a crucial role in the low scoring 1990 Grand Final, which Collingwood went on to win.

The barrel chested Kelly was known for being a tough and hot headed footballer.  He had many appearances to the tribunal for rough play. One incident occurred in 1992 when playing against Sydney, Kelly charged at Sydney's Ben Doolan, causing many of Doolan's teeth to fall out.

Craig Kelly is also famous for pinching opposition players to niggle them such as Richmond's Stephen Jurica, Hawthorn's Jason Dunstall and Geelong duo David Mensch and Gary Ablett, which Ablett stated in his new biography (2007).

Kelly retired after Collingwood's final match of the 1996 season, a round 22 win against the Brisbane Bears, along with Alan Richardson.

Business
After his retirement, Craig founded Elite Sports Properties with Rob Woodhouse - now TLA Worldwide. The company deals mainly with sports management and marketing. Kelly is a player manager to many top current AFL stars.

Coaching
Craig Kelly was the coach of the Mansfield Eagles in the Goulburn Valley Football League and coached them to the GV premiership in 2009. He has also played some games for the club.

References
 Elite Sports
 Mansfield Eagles VCFL Website
 The Eagles Nest (Official Mansfield Football and Netball Club Website)

External links
 
 

1966 births
Collingwood Football Club players
Collingwood Football Club Premiership players
Living people
Norwood Football Club players
Australian sports agents
Australian rules footballers from South Australia
Mansfield Football Club players
One-time VFL/AFL Premiership players